This is a list of the members of the European Parliament for France from 1989 to 1994.

List

References

 Official 'Members of the European Parliament'

1989
List
France